A Special Part of Me is an album by American pop singer Johnny Mathis that was released on January 22, 1984, by Columbia Records and reunited him with his "Too Much, Too Little, Too Late" partner Deniece Williams on one of the LP's two duets, "Love Won't Let Me Wait", which is also the only song on the album that was previously recorded and released by another artist. This continuing trend away from the cover album genre would reach its limit with his next studio release, Right from the Heart, which only had original material.

A Special Part of Me made its first appearance on Billboard magazine's Top LPs & Tapes chart in the issue dated March 10, 1984, and remained there for 19 weeks, peaking at number 157. It also made it to number 45 during a three-week run on the UK album chart that began on September 15 of that year.

"Love Won't Let Me Wait" had its chart debut on Billboard magazine's list of the 100 most popular R&B singles in the US in the issue dated February 25, 1984, where it peaked at number 32 over the course of 12 weeks. The March 24 issue marked its first appearance on the magazine's list of the 50 most popular Adult Contemporary records in the US, where it spent 13 weeks and reached number 14. The next issue, dated March 31, saw its debut on the "Bubbling Under the Hot 100" chart, where it got as high as number 106.

Another song from the album, "Simple", began a 12-week run on the R&B chart two months later, in the May 19 issue, that took the song to number 43. The Adult Contemporary chart in the following issue, dated May 26, was its next debut and the beginning of a 16-week stay, during which time it made it to number six. It also enjoyed eight weeks on the Billboard Hot 100 that began the following month, in the issue dated June 23, giving Mathis a number 81 hit, and reached number eight on the Canadian AC chart.

The fact that the front cover photograph was taken at the Carlyle Hotel in Miami, Florida, and the choice of pastels for both the album design and the clothing Mathis wears in the photo might suggest that the look was inspired by the influential hit show Miami Vice, but the television series debuted on September 16, 1984—eight months after this album was released.

On January 15, 2013, Funkytowngrooves released an expanded edition of the album on compact disc that included two additional versions of "Simple" that came out in 1984 on a separate 12-inch single.

Track listing
From the liner notes for the original album:

 "Simple" (Marvin Morrow, Keith Stegall) – 3:43
 Dennis Belfield – bass 
 Michel Colombier – Fender Rhodes, piano, Jupiter 8 
 Bill Cuomo – Prophet 
 David Williams – guitar 
 Jerry Hey – horn arrangements 
 "Love Won't Let Me Wait"  performed with Deniece Williams  (Vinnie Barrett, Bobby Eli) – 4:16
 Abe Laboriel – bass 
 Michel Colombier – Fender Rhodes, Jupiter 8, DX7, horn arrangements 
 David Williams – guitar 
 "The Best Is Yet to Come" (Alan Roy Scott, Brian Short) – 4:14
 Abe Laboriel – bass 
 Michel Colombier – Fender Rhodes, Jupiter 8, horn arrangements 
 David Williams – guitar 
 "Lead Me to Your Love" (Michel Colombier, Kathy Wakefield) – 4:21
 Dennis Belfield – bass 
 Paulinho da Costa – percussion 
 Michel Colombier – Fender Rhodes, piano, Jupiter 8 
 Bill Cuomo – Prophet 
 Marty Walsh – acoustic guitar 
 "You're a Special Part of Me" performed with Angela Bofill  (Angela Bofill, Loree Gold) – 4:13
 Abe Laboriel – bass 
 Michel Colombier – Fender Rhodes, Jupiter 8, horn arrangements 
 Luis Conte – percussion 
 David Williams – guitar 
 "Love Never Felt So Good" (Paul Anka, Michael Jackson, Kathy Wakefield) – 4:20
 Nathan East – bass 
 Michel Colombier – Fender Rhodes, Jupiter 8 
 Luis Conte – percussion 
 Marty Walsh – acoustic guitar 
 David Williams – guitar 
 Bill Cuomo – Prophet, Yamaha Chroma 
 Jerry Hey – horn arrangements 
 "Priceless" (Leon Ware) – 4:05
 Dennis Belfield – bass 
 Paulinho da Costa – percussion 
 Michel Colombier – Fender Rhodes, piano, Jupiter 8 
 Bill Cuomo – Prophet 
 Larry Carlton –guitar 
 "One Love" (Eric Kaz, Wendy Waldman) – 3:58
 Dennis Belfield – bass 
 Michel Colombier – Fender Rhodes, piano, Jupiter 8 
 Bill Cuomo – Prophet 
 Marty Walsh – guitar 
 "Right Here and Now" (Barry Mann, Cynthia Weil) – 3:27
 Nathan East – bass 
 Michel Colombier – Fender Rhodes, piano, Jupiter 8, horn arrangements 
 Marty Walsh – acoustic guitar 
 David Williams – guitar 
 Bill Cuomo – Prophet, Yamaha Chroma 
 Jerry Hey – horn arrangements

2013 and 2017 CD bonus tracks
These two tracks were mixed by David Todd and Nick Martinelli and released in 1984 as a 12-inch single:
 "Simple" (Vocal Version) (Marvin Morrow, Keith Stegall) – 5:55
 "Simple" (Instrumental Version) (Marvin Morrow, Keith Stegall) – 4:52
Both tracks were also included on the 2013 Funkytowngrooves reissue and the album's CD release as part of the 2017 box set The Voice of Romance: The Columbia Original Album Collection.

Recording dates
From the liner notes for the 2013 CD reissue:

March 9, 1983 – "Lead Me to Your Love", "Love Never Felt So Good", "One Love", "Right Here and Now", "You're a Special Part of Me"
April 13, 1983 – "Priceless", "Simple" (all versions)
August 16, 1983 – "The Best Is Yet to Come", "Love Won't Let Me Wait"

Song information

The only cover on this album, "Love Won't Let Me Wait", was a number one R&B hit for Major Harris in 1975 that also reached number five pop, number 33 Easy Listening, and number 37 on the UK singles chart. The Harris record also earned Gold certification from the Recording Industry Association of America for selling one million units in the US.

Additionally, the song "Love Never Felt So Good" was based on a demo track by pop singer Michael Jackson, recorded in 1983. The following year, writer Paul Anka gave Mathis permission to use the song, at which point Mathis recorded an R&B remix with revised lyrics by Anka and Kathleen Wakefield. The Jackson version was eventually leaked online in 2006, and received a proper release under Jackson's branding in 2014 as a part of his posthumous album Xscape.

Personnel

Original album
From the liner notes for the original album:

 Performers

Johnny Mathis – vocals
Angela Bofill – vocals ("You're a Special Part of Me"), background vocals
Deniece Williams – vocals ("Love Won't Let Me Wait")
Wayne Anthony – background vocals
Endre Granat – concertmaster
Larry Hall – trumpet
Jerry Hey – trumpet
James Ingram – background vocals
Phillip Ingram – background vocals
Phil Perry – background vocals
Darryl Phinnessee – background vocals
Bill Reichenbach – trombone
J. R. Robinson – drums 
Ernie Watts – saxophone, all sax solos
Larry Williams – saxophone

 Production
Denny Diante – producer
Michel Colombier – arranger; all string arrangements
Larry Hirsch – recording engineer, mixing engineer
Bill Jackson – additional engineer
Terry Christian – additional engineer
Mike Reese – mastering engineer
Jo-Anne McGettrick – A&R Coordinator
F. G. Bodner – front cover wardrobe
Nancy Donald – design
Tony Lane – design
David Vance – photographer
Mixed at Sunset Sound Studios, Hollywood, California
Mastered at the Mastering Lab, Los Angeles, California

Funkytowngrooves reissue
From the liner notes for the 2013 reissue:

Tony Calvert – reissue producer
Randy Mahon – assistant reissue producer
Matt Murphy – production manager
Gavin Wallace – package design
Alex Henderson – liner notes
Mastered by Sean Brennan at Battery Studios, New York, from the original master tapes

References

Bibliography

 
 
 
 * 

1984 albums
Johnny Mathis albums
Columbia Records albums
Albums recorded at Sunset Sound Recorders